The 1927 Miami Redskins football team was an American football team that represented Miami University as a member of the Buckeye Athletic Association (BAA) and the Ohio Athletic Conference (OAC) during the 1927 college football season. In its fourth season under head coach Chester Pittser, Miami compiled an 8–1 record (3–1 against conference opponents) and finished in second place out of six teams in the BAA.

Schedule

References

Miami
Miami
Miami RedHawks football seasons
Miami Redskins football